The 2010 Guam gubernatorial election was held on November 2, 2010. Republican Governor Felix P. Camacho was term-limited in 2010 and ineligible to run for re-election. In January 2009, the website D.C.'s Political Report predicted that the Republican Party would retain the governorship. Republican Eddie Calvo won the election.

The Democratic and Republican primary elections were held on September 4, 2010.

Democratic primary

Governor/Lt. Governor 
This is the first gubernatorial election in 40 years in which there was no contested Democratic primary election.

Announced/Declared 
Former Governor Carl Gutierrez Previously served as Governor for two terms from January 2, 1995 until January 6, 2003.
Senator Frank Aguon is Gutierrez's running mate. Previously ran for Lt. Governor as the running mate of gubernatorial candidate Robert Underwood in the 2006 election.

Declined 
Attorney Mike Phillips
Amanda L.G. Santos - Mother of the late politician and Chamorro activist Senator Angel Santos. Withdrew to run for a Senate seat in the Legislature of Guam.
Dr. Vince Akimoto – Santos' announced running mate before their ticket withdrew from the gubernatorial race.
Robert A. Underwood – former Delegate to the U.S. House of Representatives and current President of the University of Guam.

Republican primary

Governor/Lt. Governor

Announced/Declared 
Senator Eddie B. Calvo, officially announced team candidacy on July 16, 2009.
Senator Ray Tenorio is Calvo's running mate.

Defeated in primary
Lieutenant Governor Michael W. Cruz
Senator James Espaldon was Cruz's running mate.

Results

General election results

References

External links
Eddie Calvo and Ray Tenorio official 2010 campaign
Carl Gutierrez and Frank Aguon Jr. official 2010 campaign

Gubernatorial
Guam
Guam